is a Super Famicom adventure video game based on the 1951 Walt Disney motion picture Alice in Wonderland.

Gameplay

There is a story mode, a painting mode, and midway-style games. Story mode comes in interactive mode (with passwords) or as a short movie that can be watched in less than an hour. The game is directed towards children, and literacy in both Japanese and English is required to properly enjoy the story mode and to fully understand the rules. The three arcade games include painting the roses red, whacking characters from the story, and matching creatures like in the card game Concentration.

There is only one eraser tool and paintings cannot be saved. The full 256-color palette is reserved for the blank canvas. The character canvases can use only 16 colors and are good for teaching hand-to-eye coordination with children. During the interactive adventure, the Queen of Hearts divides a magic globe into three different colored miniature globes. As a result, all the color in Wonderland turns into monochrome and Alice must find the globes to restore color to Wonderland.

Additional content is unlocked by scanning barcodes with Barcode Battler II connected via a Barcode Battler II Interface.

The SNES Mouse is supported.

See also

Alice's Adventures in Wonderland, original 1865 Lewis Carroll novel
List of Disney video games

References

External links
 List of video games released by SAS Sakata 

1995 video games
Drawing video games
Epoch Co. games
Japan-exclusive video games
Point-and-click adventure games
Single-player video games
Super Nintendo Entertainment System games
Super Nintendo Entertainment System-only games
Video games based on Alice in Wonderland
Video games based on films
Video games developed in Japan
Video games using barcodes